Disney XD was an Australian subscription television channel, which was a 24- hour cable and satellite channel. Disney XD was launched 10 April 2014 on Foxtel. It aired live-action, sports and animation shows which were aimed at boys aged six to fourteen.

Disney XD’s programming consisted of animation shows such as Star Wars Rebels, Ultimate Spider-Man, Avengers Assemble and Hulk: The Agents of S.M.A.S.H. Disney XD also premiered original series such as Mighty Med, Lab Rats, Kickin’ It, Crash & Bernstein, Phineas and Ferb, and Gravity Falls.

The channel was shut down on 6 January 2019 and was removed from the kids tier channels from Foxtel due to the launch of Disney+ streaming service in Australia and New Zealand.

History

History of Disney XD
Disney XD was originally launched in America on 13 February 2009. Rich Ross, president of Disney Channels Worldwide, stated the purpose of Disney XD was Disney wanted to “create a destination for boys” pursuing gender-specific viewing strategies that defined the enterprise of Disney XD.

Disney XD’s purpose was to create a new space for the young Disney boy market as according to a New York Times article, the “Disney Channel’s audience is 40 percent male, but girls drive most of the related merchandising sales.”

Disney XD changed its marketing strategies In two ways, first by changing its target audience to boys aged six to eight and second by shifting its programming to more animated content rather than live-action and drama. These program changes which Disney XD initiated coincided with two major purchases on behalf of the company. In 2009, the company’s purchased comic book giant Marvel for $4.2 billion and in 2012, they purchased Star Wars for $4 billion. Today, both assets account for a majority of Disney XD’s current programming. Marvel delivers Guardians of the Galaxy, Ultimate Spiderman, and Marvel Avengers Assemble while the Star Wars franchise delivers Star Wars Rebels, LEGO Star Wars, and The Freemaker Adventures.

History of Disney XD For Australian and New Zealand television
On 3 February 2014, Australian subscription television provider Foxtel announced it would launch two new family-genre channels over Easter 2014. In late February, it was announced Disney XD would be one of these family channels, scheduled to launch on 10 April 2014.

On 24 December 2014, the channel launched in New Zealand on Sky Television. On 27 February 2017, Disney XD launched on Fetch TV under the "Ultimate" package.

On 1 December 2018, it was announced that Disney XD would cease broadcast on 6 January 2019, with a selection of programming moving to Disney Channel. Programs included Star Wars Resistance and various Marvel animation series. However, Disney Channel along with Disney Junior both ceased broadcast on 30 April 2020 due to the launch of the Disney+ streaming service in Australia.

Programming
Disney XD was a 24-hour Australian cable and satellite channel. The name XD, short for “Extreme Digital,” evokes the notion of extreme sports as well as a technological mastery. Disney XD's programming consisted of animated series, live-action series and sports for young boys. Regular programming included: Star Wars Rebels, Ultimate Spider-Man, Avengers Assemble and Hulk: The Agents of S.M.A.S.H. Disney XD will also premiere original series such as Mighty Med, Lab Rats, Kickin’ It, Crash & Bernstein, Phineas and Ferb, and Gravity Falls.

Disney XD also launched D|XP which was a daily over night programming block for aimed at entertaining gamers and esports enthusiasts ages 13 and up. The programming block featured content from and produced with ESPN, the Disney Digital Network, Maker, IGN, Attack Media, Warner Bros. Television Group’s Blue Ribbon Content, Banger Films, ESL and Vice’s Waypoint.

Reception
Disney XD was received well through its programming of shows such as shows such as Phineas and Ferb with its first ever show presented on air with the episode with the Phineas and Ferb episode "Dude, We're Getting the Band Back Together" being the first show to air on the American channel.

However, Disney XD as a whole initially failed to gain a major following, Disney made changes in its intended audiences advertising to a narrower audience of boys between the age of six and fourteen and relying more on animation television programs rather than live action programs.

Disney XD’s made changes to its programming and broadcasting to gain more positive reception through mergers with other companies. In 2009, the Disney company purchased comic book giant Marvel for $4.2 billion and in 2012, they purchased Star Wars for $4 billion. Today, both assets account fora majority of Disney XD’s current programming. Marvel delivers Guardians of the Galaxy, Ultimate Spiderman, and Marvel Avengers Assemble while the Star Wars franchise delivers Star Wars Rebels, LEGO Star Wars: The Freemaker Adventures as a part of the regular programming on the Disney XD channel.

Closure
Disney XD was shut down from both Foxtel and Sky on the 6th of January 2019, due to Disney’s decision to stop broadcasting Disney XD in Australia. When the channel first closed television shows such as Walk the Prank, Spider-Man, Avenger's Assemble, Guardians of the Galaxy, Hulk and the Agents of SMASH, Star Wars Rebels, Star Wars Resistance and Pokémon: Sun & Moon were migrated to the Disney Channel on Foxtel on the 6th of January 2019.

TV Shows that did not merge over to the Disney Channel included Right Now Kapow, Oscar’s Oasis, Future Worm, Mech‐X4, Fish Hooks, The New Yoda Chronicles, Lego Marvel Super Heroes, Wander Over Yonder, Kirby Buckets, Penn Zero: Part‐Time Hero, Crash & Bernstein and Harry & Bunnie and Gamer’s Guide to Pretty Much Everything. However, most of the programming was available on Foxtel Demand library until the network closed in New Zealand on 30 November 2019 on Sky, and in Australia on 1 March 2020 on Foxtel.

Foxtel released a statement stating that the Disney Channel and Disney Junior will no longer be available from the 29th of February 2020, which led to all programming being merged into Disney’s streaming service Disney+.

Disney XD, Disney Channel and Disney Junior were also discontinued from other countries as well, such as the UK with a Disney Spokesperson stating “From October 1st, Disney+ will become the exclusive home for content from Disney Channel, Disney XD and Disney Junior in the UK.”

The Spokesperson also stated “Walt Disney Company remains committed to our kids channels business,” and that the company plans to “execute distribution agreements for Disney channels in many markets where Disney+ is also available.”

References

Disney XD
English-language television stations in Australia
Children's television channels in Australia
Television channels and stations established in 2014
Television channels and stations disestablished in 2019
2014 establishments in Australia
2014 establishments in New Zealand
2019 disestablishments in Australia
2019 disestablishments in New Zealand
Television channels in New Zealand
English-language television stations in New Zealand
Television channel articles with incorrect naming style
Defunct television channels in Australia